Dianous is a genus of beetles belonging to the family Staphylinidae.

The species of this genus are found in Eurasia and Northern America.

Species:
 Dianous acuminifer Puthz, 1984

References

Staphylinidae
Staphylinidae genera